The Northern Ireland Statistics and Research Agency (NISRA) is an executive agency within the Department of Finance in Northern Ireland. The organisation is responsible for the collection and publication of statistics related to the economy, population and society of Northern Ireland. It is responsible for conducting the decennial census, with the last Census in Northern Ireland held on 21 March 2021, and incorporates the General Register Office (GRO) for Northern Ireland which is responsible for the registration of births, marriages, civil partnerships and deaths.

See also
 Central Statistics Office (Ireland)
 Office for National Statistics
 UK Statistics Authority
 Census in the United Kingdom

External links
 

Northern Ireland Executive
Demographics of Northern Ireland
National statistical services
Statistical organisations in the United Kingdom